The 2022 J1 League, also known as the  for sponsorship reasons, was the 30th season of the J1 League, the top Japanese professional league for association football clubs, since its establishment in 1993.

Kawasaki Frontale were the defending champions, having won their fourth and second consecutive title in 2021 with four rounds to play. Yokohama F. Marinos reclaimed the trophy, winning its fifth J.League and seventh Japanese title on the final day of the season. Brazilian forward Thiago Santana scored 14 goals for Shimizu S-Pulse, the least number of goals from a player who became the league top scorer and the first to also suffer relegation in the same season.

Changes from the previous season
There were four teams instead of two relegated last season to 2022 J2 League due to impacts related to the COVID-19 pandemic to made up the decision of no relegation in the 2020 season, which saw the number of teams rise to 20. They were Tokushima Vortis, Oita Trinita, Vegalta Sendai, and Yokohama FC.

Two teams were promoted from the 2021 J2 League: Júbilo Iwata, who won the title and returned to J1 after an two-year absence, and Kyoto Sanga who finished second, returning to J1 after 11 seasons.

Clubs

Personnel and kits

Managerial changes

Foreign players
From the 2021 season, there is no limitations on signing foreign players, but clubs could only register up to five of them for a single matchday squad. Players from J.League partner nations (Thailand, Vietnam, Myanmar, Malaysia, Cambodia, Singapore, Indonesia, and Qatar) were exempted from these restrictions.

Players name in bold indicates the player is registered during the midseason transfer window.
Player's name in italics indicates the player has Japanese nationality in addition to their FIFA nationality, holds the nationality of a J.League partner nation, or is exempt from being treated as a foreign player due to having been born in Japan and being enrolled in, or having graduated from an approved type of school in the country.

League table

Results table

Promotion–relegation playoffs
In the playoffs, officially called the 2022 J.League J1/J2 Play-offs, the 16th-placed team of the J1 League (Kyoto Sanga) faced the winners of the J2 League promotion playoffs. Should they lose, the J2 team would be promoted in their place for the 2023 J1 League. Fagiano Okayama, Roasso Kumamoto, Oita Trinita, and Montedio Yamagata qualified for the promotion playoffs as they finished between third and sixth in the 2022 J2 League. 

In the first two rounds of the playoffs, if the score was tied after 90 minutes, no extra time was played and the winners were the team with the higher finish in the J2 League (i.e. the home team). In the final match at the J1 team's home, if the score was tied after 90 minutes, no extra time would be played, and both teams stay at their respective leagues.

First round

Second round

Final

Kyoto Sanga remained in J1 League. Roasso Kumamoto remained in J2 League.

Season statistics

Scoring

Top scorers

Hat-tricks

Top assists

Clean sheets

Discipline

Player
Most yellow cards: 7
  Dodi (Kashiwa Reysol)
  Juanma (Avispa Fukuoka)
  Diego Pituca (Kashima Antlers)
  Yuji Takahashi (Kashiwa Reysol)
  Hisashi Appiah Tawiah (Kyoto Sanga)

 Most red cards: 1
  Takahiro Akimoto (Urawa Red Diamonds)
  Takuya Aoki (FC Tokyo)
  Takuma Arano (Hokkaido Consadole Sapporo)
  Shogo Asada (Kyoto Sanga)
  Akito Fukumori (Hokkaido Consadole Sapporo)
  Fabián González (Júbilo Iwata)
  Ricardo Graça (Júbilo Iwata)
  Douglas Grolli (Avispa Fukuoka)
  Shinnosuke Hatanaka (Yokohama F. Marinos)
  Yuta Imazu (Sanfrecce Hiroshima)
  Hirokazu Ishihara (Shonan Bellmare)
  Atsuki Ito (Urawa Red Diamonds)
  Ken Iwao (Urawa Red Diamonds)
  Tomoki Iwata (Yokohama F. Marinos)
  Jung Sung-ryong (Kawasaki Frontale)
  Naoto Kamifukumoto (Kyoto Sanga)
  Takumi Kamijima (Kashiwa Reysol)
  Daiki Kaneko (Kyoto Sanga)
  Naoki Kanuma (Júbilo Iwata)
  Ryuho Kikuchi (Vissel Kobe)
  Kim Jin-hyeon (Cerezo Osaka)
  Kim Min-tae (Kashima Antlers)
  Yuki Kobayashi (Vissel Kobe)
  Kwon Kyung-won (Gamba Osaka)
  Anderson Lopes (Yokohama F. Marinos)
  Kuryu Matsuki (FC Tokyo)
  Daiki Miya (Shonan Bellmare)
  Takahiro Ogihara (Vissel Kobe)
  Kazuki Oiwa (Shonan Bellmare)
  Kohei Okuno (Gamba Osaka)
  Tiago Pagnussat (Nagoya Grampus)
  Patric (Gamba Osaka)
  Diego Pituca (Kashima Antlers)
  Yusuke Segawa (Shonan Bellmare)
  Tsukasa Shiotani (Sanfrecce Hiroshima)
  Takanori Sugeno (Hokkaido Consadole Sapporo)
  Daiki Sugioka (Shonan Bellmare)
  Kento Tachibanada (Kawasaki Frontale)
  Hirotaka Tameda (Cerezo Osaka)
  Shogo Taniguchi (Kawasaki Frontale)
  Gabriel Xavier (Hokkaido Consadole Sapporo)
  Norimichi Yamamoto (Júbilo Iwata)
  Ryosuke Yamanaka (Cerezo Osaka)
  Yutaka Yoshida (Nagoya Grampus)

Club
 Most yellow cards: 54
 Kashiwa Reysol

 Most red cards: 4
 Hokkaido Consadole Sapporo
 Júbilo Iwata
 Shonan Bellmare

Awards

Monthly awards

Annual awards

See also  
Japan Football Association (JFA)
2022–23 WE League season
2022 Gamba Osaka season
2022 Júbilo Iwata season
2022 Kashima Antlers season
2022 Kawasaki Frontale season
2022 Shimizu S-Pulse season
2022 Urawa Red Diamonds season
2022 Yokohama F. Marinos season

References

External links 
 English official website
 Japanese official website
 J.League Data Site 

J1 League seasons
1
Japan